The 2008 United States presidential election in California took place on November 4, 2008, in California as part of the 2008 United States presidential election. Voters chose 55 electors, the most out of any of the 50 states, to the Electoral College, who voted for president and vice president.

California was won by Democratic nominee Barack Obama with a 24.1% margin of victory. No Republican has carried the state in a presidential election since George H. W. Bush in 1988. Prior to the election, California was considered to be a state Obama would win or as a safe blue state. With its 55 electoral votes, California was Obama's largest electoral prize in 2008.

As of the 2020 presidential election, this is the last time the Democratic candidate carried Trinity County in a presidential election.

Primaries

For other parties, see California state elections, February 2008.

On February 5, 2008, presidential primaries were held by all parties with ballot access in the state.

Democratic

The 2008 California Democratic presidential primary took place on February 5, 2008, also known as Super Tuesday. California was dubbed the "Big Enchilada" by the media because it offers the most delegates out of any other delegation. Hillary Clinton won the primary.

Process
In the primary, 370 of California's 441 delegates to the Democratic National Convention were selected. The remaining delegates were superdelegates not obligated to vote for any candidate at the convention. Of these delegates, 241 were awarded at the congressional district level, and the remaining 129 were awarded to the statewide winner. Candidates were required to receive at least 15% of either the district or statewide vote to receive any delegates. Registered Democrats and Decline to State voters were eligible to vote.

Polls

The latest six polls were averaged (only counting the latest Zogby poll).

Results

Republican

The 2008 California Republican primary was held on February 5, 2008, with a total of 173 national delegates at stake.

Process 
The delegates represented California at the Republican National Convention. There were three delegates to every congressional district and fourteen bonus delegates. The winner in each of the 53 congressional districts was awarded all of that district's delegates. The statewide winner was awarded 11 of the 14 bonus delegates, with the 3 remaining delegates assigned to party leaders. Voting in the primary was restricted to registered Republican voters.

Polls 

Early polls showed Rudy Giuliani in the lead. Polls taken closer to the primary either showed Mitt Romney or John McCain as the favored candidate.

Results

American Independent Party
The American Independent Party held its primary February 5, 2008

Green Party
The Green Party held its primary February 5, 2008.

Libertarian
The Libertarian Party held its primary February 5, 2008.

Peace and Freedom
The Peace and Freedom Party held its primary February 5, 2008.

Campaign

Predictions

Polling

Obama won most opinion polls taken prior to the election. Until October 9, his lead ranged from 7 to 15 points in most polls. However, after October 9, his lead expanded to more than 20 consistently. In the final three polls he averaged 59%, while McCain averaged 34%; which is close to the results on election day.

Fundraising
Obama raised a total of $124,325,459 from the state. McCain raised a total of $26,802,024.

Advertising and visits
The Obama campaign spent almost $5,570,641. The McCain campaign spent $1,885,142. Obama visited the state six times. McCain visited the state eight times.

Analysis
California was once a Republican leaning swing state, supporting Republican candidates in every election from 1952 through 1988, except in 1964. However, since the 1990s, California has become a reliably Democratic state with a highly diverse ethnic population (mostly Latino) and liberal bastions such as the San Francisco Bay Area and Los Angeles County. The last time the state was won by a Republican candidate was in 1988 by George H. W. Bush.

Obama won by a historic margin, with 61.01% of the votes. Most news organizations called California for Obama as soon as the polls in the state closed. He was projected the winner of the state along with Washington, Hawaii, and Oregon at the same time, whose combined electoral votes caused all news organizations to declare Obama the president-elect. The last time the margin was higher in the state was in 1936 when Franklin D. Roosevelt won with 66.95% of the vote.

In San Francisco and Alameda County (which includes Oakland and Berkeley), four out of five voters backed the Democratic candidate. Elsewhere in the Bay Area, Obama won every county by a three to two margin or greater. In Los Angeles County, Obama won almost 70% of the votes. His combined margin in the Bay Area and Los Angeles County would have been more than enough to carry the state.

Obama also made considerable headway in historically Republican areas of the state. Fresno County, for example, a heavily populated county in the Central Valley, went from giving Bush a 16% margin to a 2% margin for Obama. San Diego County moved from a six-percent margin for Bush to a 10-point margin for Obama—only the second time since World War II that a Democrat has carried this military-dominated county. San Bernardino and Riverside went from double-digit Republican victories to narrow Democratic wins. Ventura County also moved from Republican to Democratic. Orange County, historically one of the most Republican suburban counties in the nation, went from a 21-point margin for Bush to only a 2.5-point margin for McCain.

Voter turnout was also fairly higher than the national average. The 79% turnout of registered voters in the state was the highest since the 1976 presidential election.

Despite the Democratic landslide in California, during the same election, a ballot proposition to ban same-sex marriage narrowly passed. A number of counties that had voted for Obama voted yes for it, as it was supported by Hispanics and African Americans. Even though Obama considered marriage to be between a man and a woman at the time, he opposed the "divisive and discriminatory efforts to amend the California Constitution... the U.S. Constitution or those of other states". Arnold Schwarzenegger, the state's Republican governor and a supporter of John McCain, opposed the proposition, though McCain supported it.

Results
The following are official results from the California Secretary of State.

By county
The results below are primarily compiled from the final reports available from the Secretary of State. The "others" category also includes write-in votes.

Counties that flipped from Republican to Democratic
 Butte (largest city: Chico)
 Fresno (largest town: Fresno)
 Nevada (largest town: Truckee)
 Merced (largest community: Merced)
 Riverside (largest city: Riverside)
 San Bernardino (largest town: San Bernardino)
 San Diego (largest community: San Diego)
 San Joaquin (largest city: Stockton)
 San Luis Obispo (largest town: San Luis Obispo)
 Stanislaus (largest community: Modesto)
 Trinity (largest community: Weaverville)
 Ventura (largest city: Ventura)

By congressional district
Obama carried 42 of 53 congressional districts in California, including eight districts held by Republicans.

Electors
Technically the voters of California cast their ballots for electors: representatives to the Electoral College. California is allocated 55 electors because it has 53 congressional districts and 2 senators. All candidates who appear on the ballot or qualify to receive write-in votes must submit a list of 55 electors, who pledge to vote for their candidate and his or her running mate, to the California Secretary of State. Whoever wins the majority of votes in the state is awarded all 55 electoral votes. Their chosen electors then vote for president and vice president. Although electors are pledged to their candidate and running mate, they are not obligated to vote for them. An elector who votes for someone other than his or her candidate is known as a faithless elector.

The electors of each state and the District of Columbia met on December 15, 2008, to cast their votes for president and vice president. The Electoral College itself never meets as one body. Instead the electors from each state and the District of Columbia met in their respective capitols. In California the 55 electors meet in the State Capitol building in Sacramento to cast their ballots.

The following were the members of the Electoral College from California. All were pledged to and voted for Barack Obama and Joe Biden.

Jaime Alvarado
William Ayer
Joe Baca Jr.
Ian Blue
Roberta Brooks
Nathan Brostrom
Mark Cibula
Robert Conaway
Ray Cordova
Lawrence Du Bois
James Farley
John Freidenrich
Mark Friedman
Bobby Glaser

Audrey Gordon
Robert Handy
Ilene Haber
Mary Hubert
Aleita Huguenin
Richard Hundrieser
Fred Jackson
Patrick Kahler
Mary Keadle
LeRoy King
Vinz Koller
Mark Macarro
Alma Marquez
Ana Mascarenas

Betty McMillion
Michael McNerney
Gwen Moore
Jeremy Nishihara
Gregory Olzack
Joe Perez
Nancy Parrish
Lou Paulson
Anthony Rendon
Frank Salazar
David Sanchez
Larry Sheingold
Lane Sherman
Stephen Smith

Juadina Stallings
Kenneth Sulzer
Aaruni Thakur
Norma Torres
Silissa Uriarte-Smith
Sid Voorakkara
Greg Warner
Karen Waters
Sanford Weiner
Gregory Willenborg
Kelley Willis
James Yedor
Christine Young

Failed election reform

There was a proposed ballot proposition in the state to alter the way the state's electors would be distributed among presidential candidates, but the initiative failed to get onto the ballot.

Notes
Turnout information is not available because Decline to State voters were allowed to participate. There were a total of 6,749,406 eligible registered voters registered with the Democratic Party and 3,043,164 who declined to state.

See also
  February 2008 California elections
 November 2008 California elections
 Statewide opinion polling for the 2008 United States presidential election: California
 2008 Democratic Party presidential primaries
 2008 Republican Party presidential primaries

References

External links
Official list of electors for ballot candidates
Official list of electors for write-in candidates

California
United States president
2008